In astrophysics, silicon burning is a very brief sequence of nuclear fusion reactions that occur in massive stars with a minimum of about 8–11 solar masses. Silicon burning is the final stage of fusion for massive stars that have run out of the fuels that power them for their long lives in the main sequence on the Hertzsprung–Russell diagram. It follows the previous stages of  hydrogen, helium, carbon, neon and oxygen burning processes.

Silicon burning begins when gravitational contraction raises the star's core temperature to 2.7–3.5 billion kelvin (GK). The exact temperature depends on mass. When a star has completed the silicon-burning phase, no further fusion is possible. The star catastrophically collapses and may explode in what is known as a Type II supernova.

Nuclear fusion sequence and silicon photodisintegration

After a star completes the oxygen-burning process, its core is composed primarily of silicon and sulfur.  If it has sufficiently high mass, it further contracts until its core reaches temperatures in the range of 2.7–3.5 GK (230–300 keV).  At these temperatures, silicon and other elements can photodisintegrate, emitting a proton or an alpha particle.  Silicon burning proceeds by photodisintegration rearrangement, which creates new elements by the alpha process, adding one of these freed alpha particles (the equivalent of a helium nucleus) per capture step in the following sequence (photoejection of alphas not shown):

:{| border="0"
|- style="height:2em;"
| ||+ || ||→ ||
|- style="height:2em;"
| ||+ || ||→ ||
|- style="height:2em;"
| ||+ || ||→ ||
|- style="height:2em;"
| ||+ || ||→ ||
|- style="height:2em;"
| ||+ || ||→ ||
|- style="height:2em;"
| ||+ || ||→ ||
|- style="height:2em;"
| ||+ || ||→ ||
|}

Although the chain could theoretically continue, steps after nickel-56 are much less exothermic and the temperature is so high that photodisintegration prevents further progress.

The silicon-burning sequence lasts about one day before being struck by the shock wave that was launched by the core collapse. Burning then becomes much more rapid at the elevated temperature and stops only when the rearrangement chain has been converted to nickel-56 or is stopped by supernova ejection and cooling. The nickel-56 decays in a few days or weeks first to cobalt-56 and then to iron-56, but this happens later, because only minutes are available within the core of a massive star.  The star has run out of nuclear fuel and within minutes its core begins to contract.

During this phase of the contraction, the potential energy of gravitational contraction heats the interior to 5 GK (430 keV) and this opposes and delays the contraction. However, since no additional heat energy can be generated via new fusion reactions, the final unopposed contraction rapidly accelerates into a collapse lasting only a few seconds. The central portion of the star is now crushed into a neutron core with the temperature soaring further to 100 GK (8.6 MeV) that quickly cools down into a neutron star if the mass of the star is below . The outer layers of the star are blown off in an explosion known as a Type II supernova that lasts days to months. The supernova explosion releases a large burst of neutrons, which may synthesize in about one second roughly half of the supply of elements in the universe that are heavier than iron, via a rapid neutron-capture sequence known as the r-process (where the "r" stands for "rapid" neutron capture).

Binding energy

This graph shows the binding energy per nucleon of various nuclides. The binding energy is the difference between the energy of free protons and neutrons and the energy of the nuclide. If the product or products of a reaction have higher binding energy per nucleon than the reactant or reactants, then the reaction is exothermic (releases energy) and can go forward, though this is valid only for reactions that do not change the number of protons or neutrons (no weak force reactions). As can be seen, light nuclides such as deuterium or helium release large amounts of energy (a big increase in binding energy) when combined to form heavier elements—the process of fusion. Conversely, heavy elements such as uranium release energy when broken into lighter elements—the process of nuclear fission. In stars, rapid nucleosynthesis proceeds by adding helium nuclei (alpha particles) to heavier nuclei. As mentioned above, this process ends around atomic mass 56. Decay of nickel-56 explains the large amount of iron-56 seen in metallic meteorites and the cores of rocky planets.

See also
 Alpha nuclide
 Alpha process
 Stellar evolution
 Supernova nucleosynthesis
 Neutron capture:
 p-process
 r-process
 s-process

References

External links
 Stellar Evolution: The Life and Death of Our Luminous Neighbors, by Arthur Holland and Mark Williams of the University of Michigan
 The Evolution and Death of Stars, by Ian Short
 Origin of Heavy Elements, by Tufts University
 Chapter 21: Stellar Explosions, by G. Hermann
Arnett, W. D., Advanced evolution of massive stars. VII – Silicon burning / Astrophysical Journal Supplement Series, vol. 35, Oct. 1977, p. 145–159.
 

Nucleosynthesis